Khayun may refer to:
 Khayan
 Sarab-e Kian